The Bee County Courthouse, at 105 W. Corpus Christi St. in Beeville, Texas, United States, was built in 1912.  It was listed on the National Register of Historic Places in 2001.

It was designed by architect William C. Stephenson in Beaux Arts style.

Besides the courthouse, the listing included a contributing structure and a contributing object.

See also

National Register of Historic Places listings in Bee County, Texas
Recorded Texas Historic Landmarks in Bee County
List of county courthouses in Texas

References

External links

National Register of Historic Places in Bee County, Texas
Beaux-Arts architecture in Texas
Government buildings completed in 1912
County courthouses in Texas
Courthouses on the National Register of Historic Places in Texas
Buildings and structures in Bee County, Texas
1912 establishments in Texas
Texas State Antiquities Landmarks
Recorded Texas Historic Landmarks